András Hubik is a Hungarian sprint canoer who competed in the late 1970s. He won a bronze medal in the C-2 10000 m event at the 1977 ICF Canoe Sprint World Championships in Sofia.

References

Hungarian male canoeists
Living people
Year of birth missing (living people)
ICF Canoe Sprint World Championships medalists in Canadian